The National Basketball Association (NBA) presents 13 annual awards to recognize its teams, players, and coaches for their accomplishments. This does not include the NBA championship trophy which is given to the winning team of the NBA Finals. The NBA's championship trophy made its first appearance after the inaugural NBA Finals in 1947. In 1964, it was named after Walter A. Brown who was instrumental in merging the Basketball Association of America and the National Basketball League into the NBA. The Brown Trophy design remained the same until 1977 when the current trophy design was first introduced although it retained the Walter A. Brown title. In 1984, the trophy was renamed to honor former NBA commissioner Larry O'Brien. The NBA then first started awarding Eastern Conference and Western Conference championship trophies in 2001, renaming them in 2022 after former players Bob Cousy and Oscar Robertson, respectively.

Three individual awards are awarded during the postseason: the Larry Bird Eastern Conference Finals MVP, the Magic Johnson Western Conference Finals MVP, and the Bill Russell Finals MVP. The Executive of the Year is the only award not presented by the NBA. It is named annually by Sporting News but is officially recognized by the NBA.

Through the 2015–16 season and since the 2019–20 season, each individual award, with the exception of the Finals MVP, was awarded at the end of the regular season while the NBA Playoffs were ongoing. This procedure was different from the other major professional sports leagues, which have long handed out individual awards after their postseasons have concluded. The 2016–17 season was the first in which the NBA held an awards show after the completion of the Finals, during which the winners of all season-long individual awards are announced except for the winner of the J. Walter Kennedy Citizenship Award, which continued to be announced during the playoffs until 2017 and in 2018 was announced after the playoffs but before the awards show.

Aside from these annual awards, the league also has weekly and monthly honors during the regular season for its players and coaches. In 2021, the NBA made a social justice award, named after 6-time NBA champion Kareem Abdul-Jabbar, the Kareem Abdul-Jabbar Social Justice Champion Award. This award was made to recognize players who are making strides in the fight for social justice.

Team trophies

Honors

Individual awards

See also

50 Greatest Players in NBA History
NBA Rookie of the Month Award
Top 10 Coaches in NBA History
Top 10 Teams in NBA History
List of NBA All-Stars
Sports Illustrated NBA All-Decade Team (2009)
Sports Illustrated NBA All-Decade awards and honors (2009)

Notes
Though the award winner is usually determined by nine votes, fans balloting on NBA.com accounted for the tenth vote in at least one NBA Finals.
Los Angeles Clippers player, Montrezl Harrell won the 2019-20 NBA Hustle Award, which honors the player that makes the energy and effort plays to help his team win throughout the season.

References
General

Specific

National Basketball Association lists